Daoyi Zhilüe or Daoyi Zhi which may be translated as A Brief Account of Island Barbarians or other similar titles,  is a book written c. 1339 (completed c. 1349) by Yuan Dynasty Chinese traveller Wang Dayuan recounting his travels to over a hundred places in South Asia, Southeast Asia, and Africa. The book was written in present-day Sri Lanka. It described the weather, products, people, and customs of the places that Wang Dayuan visited.

The timeline for Wang Dayuan's life and travels is:

1311 - born
1330 - sailed for the first time from Quanzhou
1334 - returned to Yuan Dynasty
1337 - sailed for the second time from Quanzhou
1339 - returned to Yuan Dynasty
Content of the book (known as Dao Yi Zhu) was originally an appendix in a local gazetteer Qing Yuan Xu Zhi ( 清源续志, A Continuation of the History and Topography of Quanzhou) composed by Wu Jian in 1349. According to the Yuan poet Zhang Zhu, Daoyi Zhilüe was re-published in 1350 as an individual travel account. 

Andaya and Andaya write that Dao Yi Zhi Lue provides more information on areas east of the Malay Peninsula than any other Yuan dynasty source. According to the postscript Wang Dayuan visited all the places described. However, Park notes that 90% of the text is devoted to Southeast Asia and that Wang does not give details of his route and itinerary to West Asia. However, Deng states that Wang Dayuan's account is consistent with later Ming Dynasty accounts of Zheng He's travels. There is currently no full English translation of the book but the Chinese version is available online.  Partial translations however are available.

See also
Zhu fan zhi
Chinese exploration

References

Bibliography
 
 
 
 
 
 1330 - Singapore's Early Settlements & Trade - a short documentary about how Singapore was depicted in Wang Dayuan's Daoyi Zhilue, produced for the Singapore Bicentennial in 2019.

Chinese non-fiction books
1330s books
History books about Sri Lanka
Books about Sri Lankan natural history
Books about Sri Lankan exploration
Primary sources for early Philippine history